Dhok Mochian is a town in the Islamabad Capital Territory of Pakistan. It is located at 33° 28' 30N 73° 21' 40E with an altitude of 565 metres (1856 feet).

References 

Union councils of Islamabad Capital Territory